Brightwaters may refer to:

 Brightwaters, New South Wales, Australia
 Brightwaters, New York, United States

See also

 Brightwater (disambiguation)